Crazy from the Heat is a 1985 EP by American rock musician David Lee Roth. His debut solo recording, it was released while Roth was still lead singer for Van Halen, though he parted ways with the band several weeks later and launched a solo career. The EP is certified platinum by the RIAA, having sold more than one million copies in the United States.

Background
Crazy from the Heat consists of cover versions of songs of a decidedly dissimilar style from Roth's previous work with Van Halen, starting with the song "Easy Street", which was originally recorded by The Edgar Winter Group.

The medley of "Just a Gigolo" and "I Ain't Got Nobody" is based on Louis Prima's 1956 medley combining two pre-1930s songs. Roth's version of the medley peaked at number 12 on the Billboard Hot 100, supported by a well-received music video. Roth's version of the well-known Beach Boys' hit "California Girls" peaked at number 3 on the Billboard Hot 100, the same position that the Beach Boys' original rendition reached 20 years prior.

The EP concludes with "Coconut Grove", which was originally recorded by The Lovin' Spoonful.

According to the EP's liner notes, the cover picture of Roth was shot in the Seychelle Islands.

Roth used the title of the EP for his 1997 autobiography, and his future solo song "Goin' Crazy" uses the line "Goin crazy... from the heat."

Track listing

Personnel
 David Lee Roth – vocals
 Dean Parks – guitar on "Coconut Grove" 
 Eddie Martinez – guitars
 Sid McGinnis – guitars
 Willie Weeks – bass guitar
 John Robinson – drums
 Sammy Figueroa – percussion
 James Newton Howard – synthesizers on "Coconut Grove"
 Edgar Winter – keyboards, synthesizer, saxophone, and backing vocals on tracks 1, 2 & 3
 Brian Mann – synthesizer
 Carl Wilson – backing vocals on "California Girls"
 Christopher Cross – backing vocals on "California Girls"

Charts
Album

Singles

Certifications

References

Further reading
 

1985 debut EPs
Covers EPs
David Lee Roth EPs
Albums produced by Ted Templeman
Warner Records EPs